The Barranca Province is one of the nine provinces in the Lima Region of Peru. It was created by Law No. 23939 on October 5, 1984 by the government of President Fernando Belaunde Terry. Geographically, the province has a flat terrain crossed by the valleys of the rivers Fortaleza, Pativilca and Supe.

Political division 
The province measures  and is divided into five districts (singular: distrito), each of which is headed by a mayor (alcalde). The districts, with their capitals in parenthesis, are:

Districts
 Barranca (Barranca)
 Paramonga (Paramonga)
 Pativilca (Pativilca)
 Supe (Supe)
 Supe Puerto (Supe Puerto)

References 
  Instituto Nacional de Estadística e Informática. Banco de Información Digital. Retrieved November 3, 2007.

Provinces of the Lima Region